50 Years 50 Shows is a television special that marked 50 years of television in Australia. Broadcast on Sunday 25 September 2005 on the Nine Network and hosted by Eddie McGuire, the special counted down the top 50 greatest Australian television programmes.

Premise

The list of programs to be included in the top fifty was based on a poll of television writers, producers, directors, actors and critics. Once the top 50 was collated, their running order was decreed by the ratings the programs had achieved when broadcast: with the highest rating program in number one spot.

List 
# In Melbourne Tonight/The Graham Kennedy Show
# The Paul Hogan Show
# The Opening Ceremony of the Games of the XXVII Olympiad
# The Mavis Bramston Show
# Brides of Christ
# Kath & Kim
# The Don Lane Show
# 60 Minutes
# Number 96
# The Sullivans
# A Town Like Alice
# Homicide
# Bandstand
# A Country Practice
# Power Without Glory
# The Mike Walsh Show
# Australian Story
# Four Corners
# The Dismissal
# Blankety Blanks
# Bangkok Hilton
# Frontline
# Enough Rope with Andrew Denton
# My Name's McGooley, What's Yours?
# Hey Hey It's Saturday
# Parkinson in Australia
# The Norman Gunston Show
# Anzacs
# SeaChange
# Fast Forward
# This Is Your Life
# Young Talent Time
# Mother and Son
# Bobby Limb's Sound of Music
# Blue Murder
# Burke's Backyard
# Blue Heelers
# Skippy the Bush Kangaroo
# Geoffrey Robertson's Hypotheticals
# Countdown
# Sylvania Waters
# Graham Kennedy's Coast to Coast
# Media Watch
# The Naked Vicar Show
# The Aunty Jack Show
# Neighbours
# Foreign Correspondent
# Sunday
# Play School
# The D-Generation

Rescreening 
The program was re-aired on Monday 11 September 2006 hosted by Mike Munro to celebrate the official 50th anniversary of television in Australia.

See also
 List of Australian television series
 50 Years 50 Stars

External links
 Nine Network press release as published on the Australian TV Guide.
 ninemsn video

2005 in Australian television
Australian non-fiction television series
Lists of mass media in Australia
Nine Network specials
Australian television specials
2000s Australian television series
Golden jubilees